Franklin Township is a township in Clarke County, Iowa, USA.  As of the 2000 census, its population was 193.

Geography
According to the USGS, it contains four cemeteries: Blair, Clarke, Horton and Smyrna.

The stream of South White Breast Creek runs through this township.

References
 USGS Geographic Names Information System (GNIS)

External links
 US-Counties.com
 City-Data.com

Townships in Clarke County, Iowa
Townships in Iowa